Dart Flipcards Inc. is or was a Canadian company, based in St. Laurent, Quebec, that markets a line of novelty Mini Lunch Boxes with licensed images on them. Dart's lunch boxes are filled with chewing gum, made in Canada, inside Chinese-made tins, and are packaged in Canada.

Licensed images shown on Mini Lunch Boxes

Music
Army of Darkness, Aaron Carter, KISS, Ozzy Osbourne

Television
The Brady Bunch, Buffy the Vampire Slayer, Charmed, Hamtaro, The Osbournes, The Outer Limits, Pokémon, Rudolph the Red Nosed Reindeer, Smallville, South Park, Stargate SG-1, Survivor, Witchblade

Other
Baby Huey, Casper and Wendy, Felix the Cat, Hot Stuff the Little Devil, The Little Rascals, Mighty Mouse, NHL hockey, Pink Panther, Richie Rich, Rocky, Sonic the Hedgehog, The Three Stooges

Trading cards

The company also published trading cards.
 A 72-card set about the film Titanic in 1998 
 A The Crocodile Hunter set in 2002.
 A Fern Gully, The Last Rainforest set in 1992.

References

External links
 Official website.

Toy companies of Canada
Companies based in Montreal
Companies established in 1988
Companies based in Quebec
1988 establishments in Canada
Canadian companies established in 1988
Trading card companies